The 1993–94 YUBA League was the second season of the YUBA League, the top-tier professional basketball league in Yugoslavia (later renamed to Serbia and Montenegro).

Teams 
A total of 12 teams participated in the 1993–94 YUBA League.

Distribution
The following is the access list for this season.

Venues and locations

Personnel

First stage

Standings

Second stage

Standings

Playoffs 
Source

Bracket

Finals 
Source

|}

Game 1

Game 2

Game 3

Game 4

Game 5

Yugoslav Super Cup

Clubs in European competitions
Following the adoption of economic sanctions by the international community against FR Yugoslavia, clubs were banned to compete in the European professional club basketball system.

See also 
 1993–94 Yugoslav Super Cup
 1993–94 ACB season
 1993–94 Slovenian Basketball League

References

YUBA